Tadahiro (written: , , , , ,  or ) is a masculine Japanese given name. Notable people with the name include:

, Japanese amateur archaeologist
, Japanese footballer and manager
, Japanese politician
, Japanese noble
, Japanese racewalker
, Japanese daimyō
, Japanese politician
, Japanese daimyō
, Japanese judoka
, Japanese baseball player
, Japanese boxer
, Japanese engineer
, Japanese golfer

Japanese masculine given names